Cornelius Abraham "Dave" Frederickson (born 17 August 1950 in Lichtenburg, North West, South Africa) is a former South African rugby union player.

Playing career
Frederickson played for the Transvaal Schools team at the 1968 Craven Week tournament and at age group level played for the Transvaal under–20 team and he also represented Western Province at under–20 level.

Frederickson made his international debut for the Springboks in the second test against the visiting British Lions on 22 June 1974, at  Loftus Versfeld, Pretoria. Frederickson played a further two tests for the Springboks, the last being against the touring South American Jaguars on 3 May 1980 at Kings Park Stadium, Durban.

Test history

See also
List of South Africa national rugby union players – Springbok no. 469

References

1950 births
Living people
South African rugby union players
South Africa international rugby union players
Golden Lions players
People from Lichtenburg
Rugby union players from North West (South African province)
Rugby union hookers